Daniel Ståhl (born 27 August 1992) is a Swedish athlete specialising in the discus throw. Ståhl has crowned a fine career winning gold medals both 2019 at the World Championships and 2021 in Tokyo at the Olympic Games.

Career
He competed at the 2015 World Championships in Beijing finishing fifth. 

In 2016, he competed at the European Championships, where he finished fifth. Ståhl also competed at the Olympic Games in Rio de Janeiro the same year, where he failed to qualify for the final.  Just a couple of weeks following his failure in Rio, Ståhl competed at the Swedish Championships in Sollentuna. Not only did he win the discus throw on a new personal best 68.72 metres, it was also the new world leading throw of 2016, surpassing Christoph Harting's 68.37 metres from the Rio Olympics final.  By the end of the year, it remained the number one throw in 2016.  The day before, Ståhl had also won the shot put on a new personal best 19.38 metres. 

In June 2017, Ståhl managed a throw of 71.29 metres in Sollentuna, setting a new personal best and improving the Swedish record set in 1984 by Rickard Bruch by three centimetres. Ståhl's throw was farther than any discus throw in the world since 2013.

At the 2017 World Championships in Athletics, Ståhl won the silver medal in the discus throw event, throwing 69.19 meters. He was beaten by Lithuanian Andrius Gudžius by 2 centimeters. 

He won the silver medal at the 2018 European Championships where he was beaten again by Andrius Gudžius. Ståhl came back in the 2019 World Championships September 30 at Doha Qatar and was crowned World Champion with a winning throw of 67.59 ahead of competitor Federick Dacres. 

He won the gold medal at the 2020 Summer Olympics with a throw of 68.90 metres, ahead of his fellow countryman Simon Pettersson.

Competition record

Personal bests
Outdoor
 Shot put – 19.38 m ( Sollentuna, 27 August 2016)
 Discus throw: 71.86 m ( Bottnaryd, 29 June 2019)

Indoor
 Shot put – 18.29 m ( Gothenburg, 2015)

Personal life
Ståhl is of Finnish descent as his mother is Finnish. His mother  is a former discus thrower.

See also
Sweden at the 2015 World Championships in Athletics

References

External links

Swedish male discus throwers
Living people
People from Solna Municipality
1992 births
World Athletics Championships athletes for Sweden
Athletes (track and field) at the 2016 Summer Olympics
Olympic athletes of Sweden
Swedish people of Finnish descent
World Athletics Championships medalists
World Athletics Championships winners
Diamond League winners
Swedish Athletics Championships winners
Athletes (track and field) at the 2020 Summer Olympics
Olympic gold medalists for Sweden
Medalists at the 2020 Summer Olympics
Olympic gold medalists in athletics (track and field)
Sportspeople from Stockholm County
20th-century Swedish people
21st-century Swedish people